Struggle for the Land: Native North American Resistance to Genocide, Ecocide and Colonization is a book by Ward Churchill.  It is a collection of essays on the efforts of Native Americans in the United States and in Canada to maintain their land tenure claims against government and corporate infringement.  Equating colonization with genocide and ecocide, the author provides examples of resistance.

Beginning with an overview of the impact of legal doctrines established by the United States and Canada on Native people, and moving on to explore a series of case studies indicative of the effects of domination "by North America's settler-states," the book concludes with a discussion paper offering a scenario for an alternate future.

Publishing information
It was first published with the subtitle Indigenous Resistance to Genocide, Ecocide and Expropriation in Contemporary North America by Common Courage Press in 1993 (hardcover: ,). In 1999, it was resubtitled and released in a revised and expanded edition by Arbeiter Ring Publishing (Winnipeg).  City Lights Publishers (San Francisco) published it in 2002 as a 460-page hardcover and paperback.

Synopsis
As its foreword, the book features a poem by Jimmie Durham.  The preface is by Winona LaDuke and poems from John Trudell's Living in Reality appear as preludes to each section.  Russell Means' 1982 platform for president of the Oglala people is included as an appendix.  Maps of Indian land claims/treaty areas are included.  The book is dedicated "for my mother."

The collected essays, mostly previously published, provide a history of Native American struggle for decolonization provided through the examples of the Haudenosaunee in upstate New York, the Lakotas on the northern Plains, the Lubicon Cree in northern Alberta, and the Navajo and Newe (Western Shoshone) in the upper Sonoran.  The case is made that uranium mining, coal stripping, hydropower generation, and water diversion are ecocidal as well as genocidal, and that the ecological damage poses a threat to all North Americans.

Churchill also discusses the Native North American diaspora caused by their displacement.

 "Not only the people of the land are being destroyed, but, more and more, the land itself. The nature of native resistance to the continued onslaught of the invading industrial culture is shaped accordingly. It is a resistance forged in the crucible of a struggle for survival." —from the introduction

Awards
The book won the Gustavus Myers Award for Literature on Human Rights.

Contents (to the revised edition)

Foreword by Jimmie Durham
 Buying Time

Preface by Winona LaDuke
 Succeeding into Native North America
A Secessionist View

Introduction by Ward Churchill
The Indigenous Peoples of North America 
A Struggle Against Internal Colonialism

Part I: The Law
The Tragedy and the Travesty
The Subversion of Indigenous Sovereignty in North America
Part II: The Land
Struggle to Regain a Stolen Homeland
Iroquois Land Rights in Upstate New York
The Black Hills Are Not For Sale
The Lakota Struggle for the 1868 Treaty Territory
Genocide in Arizona
The "Navajo-Hopi Land Dispute" in Perspective
The Struggle for Newe Segobia
The Western Shoshone Battle for Their Homeland
Last Stand at Lubicon Lake
Genocide and Ecocide in the Canadian North
Part III: Other Fronts
Geographies of Sacrifice
The Radioactive Colonization of Native North America
The Water Plot
Hydrological Rape in Northern Canada
Like Sand in the Wind
The Making of an American Indian Diaspora in the United States
Part IV: An Alternative
I Am Indigenist
Notes on the Ideology of the Fourth World
Appendix by Russell Means and Ward Churchill
TREATY
The Platform of Russell Means' Campaign for President of the Oglala People, 1982
Index

See also
The Navajo People and Uranium Mining
World Uranium Hearing
 Church Rock uranium mill spill

External links
 Struggle for the Land at the publisher's site.

1993 non-fiction books
1993 in the environment
1999 in the environment
2002 in the environment
Books by Ward Churchill
Books about indigenous rights